Gusevo is a settlement in Pravdinsky District, Kaliningrad Oblast, under the administration of the Mozyrsky Rural Settlement. It had a population of 249 according to the 2010 Census.

References 

Rural localities in Kaliningrad Oblast